The Moldovan Liga 1 is the second-level division of Moldovan Football.

Former name
 Divizia A – 1992—2022

Current members

The following 12 clubs will compete in the 2022–23 season of the Moldovan Liga 1.

Champions

Performance by club

References

External links
 Moldligue.com - Site exclusively dedicated to Moldavian Divizia A tournament
 Official Site
 Divizia-A.md - Site exclusively dedicated to Moldovan Divizia A tournament
 "A" Division - Moldfoodball.com
 "A" Division - divizia nationala

 
2
Second level football leagues in Europe